The Duwamish Number 1 Site, also known as 45KI23, is an archaeological site on the Duwamish River in Seattle, Washington discovered by David Munsell, an archaeologist employed by the U.S. Army Corps of Engineers, in November 1975. The site was excavated by archaeologists in 1978, and again in 1986.

According to an archaeologic report released in 1981, the site was a shell midden and village between 670 and 1700 CE, comprising four separate eras of occupation. The researchers also found remains of ducks, as well as of mammals such as deer and elk.

The site is owned by the Port of Seattle.

See also
History of the Duwamish tribe
National Register of Historic Places listings in King County, Washington

References

Sources
Williams, David B. (2005). The Street-Smart Naturalist: Field Notes from Seattle, Graphic Arts Center Publishing Co.

Archaeological sites in Washington (state)
Buildings and structures in King County, Washington
History of Washington (state)
Native American history of Washington (state)
Archaeological sites on the National Register of Historic Places in Washington (state)
Shell middens in the United States
National Register of Historic Places in King County, Washington